Arbeiter Ring Publishing, now known as ARP Books, is a worker-owned and operated independent book publisher and distributor that specializes in progressive, radical and anarchist literature (both fiction and non-fiction). Founded by Todd Scarth and John K. Samson in Winnipeg in 1996, the publishing company was originally based in The Old Market Autonomous Zone (or A-Zone), which also houses Mondragon Bookstore and Coffee House, and other radical and worker-run organizations.  Named after Arbeiter Ring (meaning "Workers' Circle"), a radical Jewish workers' organization (which had a strong presence in Winnipeg at the outset of the 20th century and helped promote Emma Goldman's early visits to the city), Arbeiter Ring also shares a commitment to workers' self-management.  One aspect of this is the organization's promotion of participatory economics (or parecon), an alternative economic model first articulated by Michael Albert and Robin Hahnel.

Notable books
Ward Churchill, Struggle for the Land (1999 edition)
Ward Churchill, Pacifism as Pathology: Notes on an American Pseudopraxis (1998)
Caelum Vatnsdal, They Came From Within: A History of Canadian Horror Cinema (2004)

References

External links
Arbeiter Ring Publishing
Old Market Autonomous Zone

Anarchism in Canada
Anarchist organizations in North America
Anarchist publishing companies
Organizations established in 1996
Book publishing companies of Canada
Media cooperatives in Canada
Political book publishing companies
Anarchist collectives
Companies based in Winnipeg
Publishing companies based in Manitoba